Ernst Otto Åkesson (14 October 1872, Viipuri - 29 November 1939) was a Swedish-speaking Finnish lawyer and politician. He served as Minister of Justice of Finland from 14 November 1922 to 21 December 1923. He was a member of the Parliament of Finland, representing the Swedish People's Party of Finland (SFP) from 1917 to 1919 and the Agrarian League from 1922 to 1924.

References

1872 births
1939 deaths
Politicians from Vyborg
People from Viipuri Province (Grand Duchy of Finland)
Swedish People's Party of Finland politicians
Centre Party (Finland) politicians
Ministers of Justice of Finland
Members of the Parliament of Finland (1917–19)
Members of the Parliament of Finland (1922–24)
University of Helsinki alumni